Mahgoub or Mahjub is an Arabic surname that may refer to
Abdel Khaliq Mahjub (1927–1971), Sudanese politician
Ahmed Hassan Mahgoub (born 1993), Egyptian football player
Kamal Mahgoub (born 1921), Egyptian weightlifter
Mohamed Abdul Salam Mahgoub (born 1935), Egyptian military officer
El Muez Mahgoub (born 1978), Sudanese football goalkeeper
Muhammad Ahmad Mahgoub (1908–1976), Sudanese politician
Nesma Mahgoub (born 1989), Egyptian singer 
Rifaat el-Mahgoub (1926–1990), Egyptian politician